The 81st 2004 Lithuanian Athletics Championships were held in S. Darius and S. Girėnas Stadium, Kaunas on 24–25 July 2004.

Men

Women

External links 
 Lithuanian athletics

Lithuanian Athletics Championships
Lithuanian Athletics Championships, 2004
Lithuanian Athletics Championships